The name Francene has been used for three tropical cyclones in the Eastern Pacific Ocean:

 Tropical Storm Francene (1967)
 Hurricane Francene (1971)
 Tropical Storm Francene (1975)

Pacific hurricane set index articles